Qarah Tappeh (also Romanized as Qareh Tappeh; also known as Qarā Tappeh, Qara Tepe, and Rūstā-ye Qarah Tappeh) is a village in Rahal Rural District, in the Central District of Khoy County, West Azerbaijan Province, Iran. At the 2006 census, its population was 422, in 93 families.

References 

Populated places in Khoy County